The Božić family house is located in Belgrade, at 19. Господар Јевремова street. Today, this house represents a cultural monument of great importance for Serbia.

Miloje G. Bozic 

Miloje G. Bozic was born in village Čumić, near Kragujevac. G. Bozic was a merchant in Belgrade. From his biography stands out information, that Bozic due his disagreement with Prince Milos Obrenovic dynasty, was helps royal family Karađorđević to gain power. Using the technique of oil on canvas, painter Jovan Popovic, was in 1841. immortalized character of Miloje G. Bozic in a painting.

History and architecture 

Božić’s family house was built in 1836. It was the middle class ground floor house built above the cellar of a demolished Turkish building. Over the main entrance was incised the initials of the owner, and the year of building. House represents a classic example of transitory type architecture – the disposition of the floor plan is symmetrical, of Balkan type, while the facades reflect influences of western European architecture with its proportions, the rhythm of apertures and decorative elements. In the nineteenth century the house was used exclusively as a residence. Rista Hadži-Popović, exporter possessed house until 1920. From  year 1920 to 1924 house served as the studio and apartment of Toma Rosandić, and was later turned into a "painters house" where eminent Belgrade painters and sculptors used to live and work. The Serbian Museum of Theater Art also had their premises there in 1951. The house represents one of the oldest preserved houses in Belgrade.

Building today 

Božić’s family House is within the a part of a uniform ambience of the area around Dositej Lyceum.

References

Cultural Monuments of Great Importance (Serbia)
Buildings and structures in Belgrade
Culture in Belgrade
Houses completed in 1836
Stari Grad, Belgrade